A carbenium ion is a positive ion with the structure RR′R″C+, that is, a chemical species with a trivalent carbon that bears a +1 formal charge.

In older literature the name carbonium ion was used for this class, but now it refers exclusively to another family of carbocations, the carbonium ions, where the charged carbon is pentavalent. The current definitions were proposed by the chemist George Andrew Olah in 1972, and are now widely accepted.

Carbenium ions are generally highly reactive due to having an incomplete octet of electrons; however, certain carbenium ions, such as the tropylium ion, are relatively stable due to the positive charge being delocalised between the carbon atoms.

Nomenclature 

Carbenium ions are classified as primary, secondary, or tertiary depending on whether the number of carbon atoms bonded to the ionized carbon is 1, 2, or 3. (Ions with zero carbons attached to the ionized carbon, such as methenium, are usually included in the primary class).

Reactivity 
Stability typically increases with the number of alkyl groups bonded to the charge-bearing carbon. Tertiary carbocations are more stable (and form more readily) than secondary carbocations, because they are stabilized by hyperconjugation. Primary carbocations are highly unstable. Therefore, reactions such as the SN1 reaction and the E1 elimination reaction normally do not occur if a primary carbenium would be formed.

However, a carbon doubly bonded with the ionized carbon can stabilize the ion by resonance. Such cations as the allyl cation, and the benzyl cation, are more stable than most other carbocations. Molecules which can form allyl or benzyl carbeniums are especially reactive. Carbenium ions can also be stabilized by heteroatoms.

Carbenium ions may undergo rearrangement reactions from less stable structures to equally stable or more stable ones with rate constants in excess of 109 s−1. This fact complicates synthetic pathways to many compounds. For example, when pentan-3-ol is heated with aqueous HCl, the initially formed 3-pentyl carbocation rearranges to a statistical mixture of the 3-pentyl and 2-pentyl. These cations react with chloride ion to produce  3-chloropentane and 2-chloropentane in a ratio of approximately 1:2.

Types of carbenium ions

Alkylium ions
Carbenium ions can be prepared directly from alkanes by removing a hydride anion, with a strong acid. For example, magic acid, a mixture of antimony pentafluoride and fluorosulfuric acid, turns isobutane into the trimethylcarbenium cation, .

Aromatic carbenium ions

The tropylium ion is an aromatic species with the formula . Its name derives from the molecule tropine (itself named for the molecule atropine). Salts of the tropylium cation can be stable, e.g. tropylium tetrafluoroborate. It can be made from cycloheptatriene (tropylidene) and bromine or phosphorus pentachloride

It is a planar, cyclic, heptagonal ion; it also has 6 π-electrons (4n + 2, where n = 1), which fulfills Hückel's rule of aromaticity. It can coordinate as a ligand to metal atoms.

The structure shown is a composite of seven resonance contributors in which each carbon carries part of the positive charge.

In 1891 G. Merling obtained a water-soluble salt from a reaction of cycloheptatriene and bromine. The structure was elucidated by Eggers Doering and Knox in 1954.

Another aromatic carbenium ion is the cyclopropenyl or cyclopropenium ion, obtained by Ronald Breslow and John T. Groves in 1970. Though less stable than the tropylium cation, this carbenium ion can also form salts at room temperature. Solutions of such salts were found by Breslow and Groves to have spectroscopic and chemical properties matching expectations for an aromatic carbenium ion.

Triphenylmethyl (trityl) cation

The triphenylcarbenium or triphenylmethyl cation, is especially stable because the positive charge can be distributed among 10 of the carbon atoms (the 3 carbon atoms in the ortho and para positions of each of the three phenyl groups, plus the central carbon atom). It exists in the compounds triphenylmethyl hexafluorophosphate  , triphenylmethyl tetrafluoroborate , and triphenylmethyl perchlorate  . Its derivatives include the triarylmethane dyes.

Arenium ions

An arenium ion is a cyclohexadienyl cation that appears as a reactive intermediate in electrophilic aromatic substitution. For historic reasons this complex is also called a Wheland intermediate, or a σ-complex.

Two hydrogen atoms bonded to one carbon lie in a plane perpendicular to the benzene ring. The arenium ion is no longer an aromatic species; however it is relatively stable due to delocalization: the positive charge is delocalized over 5 carbon atoms via the π system, as depicted on the following resonance structures:

Another contribution to the stability of arenium ions is the energy gain resulting from the strong bond between the benzene and the complexed electrophile.

The smallest arenium ion is protonated benzene, . The benzenium ion can be isolated as a stable compound when benzene is protonated by the carborane superacid, H(CB11H(CH3)5Br6). The benzenium salt is crystalline with thermal stability up to 150 °C. Bond lengths deduced from X-ray crystallography are consistent with a cyclohexadienyl cation structure.

Acylium ions

An acylium ion is a cation with the formula RCO+. The structure is described as R−C≡O+ or R−=O. It is the synthetic and reactive equivalent of an acyl carbocation, but the actual structure has the oxygen and carbon linked by a triple bond. Such species are common reactive intermediates, for example, in the Friedel−Crafts acylations also in many other organic reactions such as the Hayashi rearrangement. Salts containing acylium ions can be generated by removal of the halide from acyl halides:
RCOCl + SbCl5 → RCO+
The C–O distance in these cations is near 1.1 ångströms, even shorter than that in carbon monoxide. Acylium cations are characteristic fragments observed in EI-mass spectra of ketones.

See also
 Borenium ion
 Nitrenium ion

References 

Cations
Reactive intermediates
Carbocations